Sauk Rapids-Rice High School, often abbreviated SRRHS, is a high school located in Sauk Rapids, Minnesota, United States. The school year at SRRHS is a trimester system consisting of five-period days.

Sports programs 
The sports offered are listed below:

 Baseball
 Basketball (Boys) 
 Basketball (Girls) 
 Cross Country (Boys) 
 Cross Country (Girls) 
 Dance Team 
 Football 
 Golf (Boys) 
 Golf (Girls) 
 Gymnastics 
 Hockey (Boys) 
 Hockey (Girls) 
 Soccer (Boys) 
 Soccer (Girls) 
 Softball 
 Swimming/Diving (Boys) 
 Swimming/Diving (Girls) 
 Tennis (Boys) 
 Tennis (Girls) 
 Track and Field (Boys) 
 Track and Field (Girls) 
 Volleyball 
 Wrestling

Activities and Fine Arts 

Activities and their instructors are as follows:

 Bowling 
 Culinary team
 DECA 
 FFA 
 German Club 
 History Day 
 Homecoming 
 IMPROV 
 Industrial Tech 
 Knowledge Bowl 
 Link Leaders 
 Math League 
 National Honor Society 
 Project 4 Teens 
 Prom Committee 
 SADD 
 Service Club 
 Spanish Club 
 Student Council 
 Yearbook

Fine Arts and their instructors are as follows:

 Chamber Singers 
 Choirs 
 Drama 
 Jazz band 
 Marching band 
 Pep band 
 Speech 
 Stage Crew 
 Storm Singers 
 Winter Colorguard 
 Winter Drumline

College level courses 

Advanced Placement Courses offered are as follows:
 Calculus I
 Spanish
 United States Government
 Psychology
 Statistics
 Literature and Composition
 United States History

College in the Classroom Courses offered through SCSU are as follows:
Chemistry
Physics
Pre-Calculus and Discrete Mathematics (PDM)
Accelerated Functions, Statistics and Trigonometry (FST)

Notable alumni
Anthony Bemboom, baseball player
Ethan Prow, Professional Hockey Player

References

Resources 
  SRRHS Fast Facts
  SRRHS Great Schools Profile

External links 
Sauk Rapids-Rice School district official website

Public high schools in Minnesota
Educational institutions established in 1908
1908 establishments in Minnesota
Education in Benton County, Minnesota